The Good Bad Egg was an American comedy short released by Columbia Pictures on March 20, 1947, starring Joe DeRita, who later joined The Three Stooges and became "Curly Joe" DeRita, and featuring Dorothy Granger, and Norman Ollestead. This was the second of four shorts in the Joe DeRita series produced by Columbia from 1946-1948; all entries were remakes of other Columbia shorts.

Plot
Joe Priggle (Joe DeRita) is an inventor staying at a rest home where he tells the story to its proprietor (Vernon Dent) his strong dislike, eggs. It all starts when he fouls up one of his inventions to a client (Emil Sitka) when he finds an egg with an address written on it, the address belongs to a single woman Florabell (Dorothy Granger). He ends up marrying her, but soon finds out that she has an obnoxious brat of a son Rudolph (Norman Ollestead). He causes nothing but trouble for Joe by shooting him in the rear end with a slingshot, a BB gun and gets blown to bits by a miniature cannon. Meanwhile, Joe is busy working on his latest invention, a state-of-the-art dishwasher. The first time he uses it, it destroys all of Florabell's fine chinaware.

Cast
Joe DeRita as Joe Priggle the Inventor
Dorothy Granger as Florabelle Priggle
Norman Ollestad as Rudolph Priggle
Symona Boniface as Member of Board of Directors
Bobby Burns as Minister
Lew Davis as Member of board of directors
Vernon Dent as Priggle's Neighbor
Frank Mills as Wedding Guest
Frank O'Connor as Member of Board of Directors
Charles Phillips as Member of board of directors
Al Thompson as Florabelle father
Victor Travers as Mr. Collins
Emil Sitka as Joe's friend
James C. Morton as Man hit with a horseshoe

Production notes
The Good Bad Egg is a remake of the Andy Clyde short film Knee Action (1937).

DeRita did not think highly of his output at Columbia Pictures, once commenting, "My comedy in those scripts was limited to getting hit on the head with something, then going over to my screen wife to say, 'Honey, don't leave me!' For this kind of comedy material, you could have gotten a busboy to do it and it would have been just as funny."

References

External links

The Good Bad Egg at threestooges.net

Columbia Pictures short films
Short film remakes
1947 films
Films directed by Jules White
American comedy short films
1947 comedy films
American black-and-white films
1940s American films
1940s English-language films